The South American leaf-toed gecko (Phyllodactylus gerrhopygus) is a species of gecko. It is found in Peru and Chile.

References

Phyllodactylus
Reptiles of Peru
Reptiles of Chile
Reptiles described in 1834